"Be My Mistake" is a song by British indie rock band, The 1975. The track is the sixth song on their third studio album, A Brief Inquiry into Online Relationships. Despite not being an official single from the album, it charted on the New Zealand and U.S. rock charts.

Meaning 
In a November 2018 interview with Pitchfork, lead singer Matty Healy described "Be My Mistake" as a song about guilt. Healy further explained "It’s about when you are a young person and you struggle sometimes to figure out what you really want. And sometimes, like a lot of things, it requires you to make a mistake before you actually understand what you have." Healy described Nick Drake as an influence for the song.

Critical reception 
Writing for PopBuzz, Katie Louise Smith called "Be My Mistake" "is almost like an even sadder sequel to 'Somebody Else' and it will one hundred percent destroy you emotionally".

Charting

References

External links 
 Official Acoustic Video

2018 songs
The 1975 songs
Songs written by Matthew Healy
English folk songs